Saint Philip is an unincorporated community in Marrs Township, Posey County, in the U.S. state of Indiana.

History
A post office was established at Saint Philip in 1872, and remained in operation until it was discontinued in 1902. The community took its name from a local church. Saint Philip was originally built up chiefly by German Catholics.

Geography

References

Unincorporated communities in Posey County, Indiana
Unincorporated communities in Indiana